Indigo Nights is a live album by Prince, mainly comprising songs played live during some of the aftershows at the indigO2 night club in London in 2007. It contains nine live versions of previously released Prince songs, four cover songs, one new song and a monologue.
The CD was only sold coupled with the 21 Nights coffee table book which was released on September 30, 2008.
The book reached number 9 on The New York Times best selling hardcover nonfiction titles.

In 2018 the album was released digitally on music platforms Tidal, Spotify, iTunes Store and Apple Music by NPG Records.

Track listing
 "3121" – 7:44 (contains interpolation of Scott Joplin's 1902 composition "The Entertainer" and "D.M.S.R.")
 "Girls & Boys" – 4:05
 "The Song of the Heart" – 1:39
 "Delirious" – 2:01
 "Just Like U" (Monologue) – 2:49
 "Satisfied" – 6:19
 "Beggin' Woman Blues" (previously unreleased song) – 6:43
 "Rock Steady" featuring Beverley Knight (Aretha Franklin cover) – 6:37
 "Whole Lotta Love" (Led Zeppelin cover) – 4:42
 "Alphabet St." – 6:09
 "Indigo Nights" (instrumental jam based on "Get on the Boat") – 3:41
 "Misty Blue" featuring Shelby J. (Dorothy Moore cover) – 4:25
 "Baby Love" featuring Shelby J. (Mother's Finest cover) – 3:54
 "The One" (with guitar solo from "The Question of U") – 9:08
 "All the Critics Love U in London" (variation of "All the Critics Love U in New York") – 7:05

References

2008 live albums
Prince (musician) albums
Albums produced by Prince (musician)
NPG Records live albums